Albert Joseph Gasteiger (known in Persian as Gāstager Khan; 28 March 1823 – 5 July 1890), was an Austrian noble and engineering officer. Born in Innsbruck, he became an instructor at the Dar ol-Fonun in Qajar Iran, as well as the manager of all civilian and military buildings at the behest of Iran's government from 1860 to 1888. He died in Bozen (present-day Bolzano, Italy).

Gasteiger was the baron of Ravenstein and Kobach. He became famous in Iran for his road constructions, and was the first European to be bestowed with the title of Khan ("lord").

References

19th-century Austrian engineers
People from Innsbruck
Austrian expatriates in Iran
People of Qajar Iran
Austrian nobility
1823 births
1890 deaths